The GdW Bundesverband deutscher Wohnungs- und Immobilienunternehmen e.V. (Federal Association of German Housing and Real Estate Enterprise Registered Associations) is a syndicate of housing co-operatives in Germany. Its members are smaller federations (mostly regional organizations): As “Federation of the Federations”, the GdW is the central association of the German housing industry.

Member Federations 
The 14 member federations of the GdW have approximately 3,200 housing enterprises as members. They represent together approximately 6.4 million dwellings, corresponding to approximately 17% of the entire and 30% of rental housing stock in Germany.

The 14 member federations of the GdW are:
 vbw Verband baden-württembergischer Wohnungs- und Immobilienunternehmen e.V.
 VdW Bayern Verband bayerischer Wohnungsunternehmen e.V.
 VdW südwest Verband der Südwestdeutschen Wohnungswirtschaft e.V.
 VdW Verband der Wohnungswirtschaft Sachsen-Anhalt e.V.
 VdWg Verband der Wohnungsgenossenschaften Sachsen-Anhalt e.V.
 Verband Berlin-Brandenburgischer Wohnungsunternehmen e.V. (BBU)
 Verband der Wohnungswirtschaft in Niedersachsen und Bremen e.V.
 Verband der Wohnungswirtschaft Rheinland Westfalen e. V.
 Verband Sächsischer Wohnungsgenossenschaften e.V. (VSWG)
 Verband Sächsischer Wohnungsunternehmen e.V. (VSWU)
 VNW Verband norddeutscher Wohnungsunternehmen e.V.
 VTW Verband Thüringer Wohnungswirtschaft e.V.
 PTW Prüfungsverband Thüringer Wohnungsunternehmen e.V.
 Genossenschaftsverband Frankfurt e.V. Hessen - Rheinland-Pfalz - Saarland - Thüringen

Housing Enterprises 
Housing enterprises overseen by regional organizations of the GdW can be divided as follows:

 Housing cooperatives
 Local housing companies
 Federation and national public housing companies
 Housing companies of the private sector
 Church housing enterprises
 Other housing enterprises

References

External links

Housing cooperatives in Germany